Katja MacLeod Kessin (1959–2006) was a German-born Canadian painter.

Biography
Kessin was born on February 7, 1959 in Hamburg, Germany. Around 1980 she emigrated to Montreal, Canada. She studied art at Concordia University, earning an MFA degree in painting 1993, and a PhD in Humanities in 2003. 

Kessin taught art at Concordia, including teaching art to non-artists. She also created an art program for women and children at a women’s shelter in Montreal. In 2000 she received a national award of merit given by the Senior Women Academic Administrators of Canada. 

Kessin died on April 1, 2006 in Montreal. In 2007 a retrospective of her work was presented at the FOFA Gallery at Concordia University.

Her work is in the collection of the Musée national des beaux-arts du Québec.

Personal
Kessin was married to Darcy MacLeod with whom she had three children.

References

1959 births
2006 deaths
Painters from Hamburg
German women painters
20th-century Canadian women artists
Concordia University alumni
Academic staff of Concordia University
Canadian women painters
20th-century Canadian painters
20th-century German painters
German emigrants to Canada